Kathy Kennedy is an American Republican Party politician currently serving as a member of the Connecticut House of Representatives from the 119th district, which includes part of Orange and Milford, since 2019. Kennedy was first elected in 2018 over Democrat Ellen Beatty. Kennedy was narrowly re-elected in 2020 over Democrat Bryan Anderson. On March 5, 2022, it was reported that Kennedy will seek re-election in the upcoming 2022 elections. Kennedy currently serves as a member of the Appropriations, Public Health, and Education Committees and is also the Ranking Member of the Executive and Legislations Nominations Committee.

References

Living people
People from Milford, Connecticut
Republican Party members of the Connecticut House of Representatives
21st-century American politicians
Year of birth missing (living people)